Larry Israelson (born August 2, 1952) is a Canadian retired professional ice hockey forward.  He played 105 games in the World Hockey Association with the Vancouver Blazers and Calgary Cowboys.

Israelson was born in Didsbury, Alberta.

Career statistics

External links

1952 births
Living people
Calgary Cowboys players
Canadian ice hockey forwards
Erie Blades players
Asiago Hockey 1935 players
Ice hockey people from Alberta
Notre Dame Fighting Irish men's ice hockey players
People from Didsbury, Alberta
Springfield Indians players
Tidewater Sharks players
Tulsa Oilers (1964–1984) players
Vancouver Blazers players
VEU Feldkirch players